Eze Nri Apia and Nri–Alike were the first and only kings to rule Nri Kingdom as joint monarchs. After succeeding Eze Nri Agụ in 1676 CE, they reigned from 1677–1700 CE. It is believed that Eze Nri Apia and Nri–Alike died on the same day.

References

Nri-Igbo
Nri monarchs
Kingdom of Nri
17th-century monarchs in Africa
18th-century monarchs in Africa